The Goodyear Airdock is a construction and storage airship hangar in Akron, Ohio. At its completion in 1929, it was the largest building in the world without interior supports.

Description 
The building has a unique shape which has been described as "half a silkworm's cocoon, cut in half the long way." There is 364,000 square feet (34 000 m2) of unobstructed floor space, or an area larger than 8 football fields side-by-side. The airdock has a volume of 55 million cubic feet (or about 1.5 million cubic meters). A control tower and radio aerial sit at its northeast end. At each end of the building are two huge semi-spherical doors that each weigh 600 tons (544 000 kg). The doors roll on 40 wheels along specially-designed curved railroad tracks, each powered by an individual power plant that can open the doors in about 5 minutes.

The airdock is so large that temperature changes within the structure can be very different from that on the outside of the structure. Furthermore, the entire structure is mounted on rollers to compensate for expansion or contraction resulting from temperature changes. When the humidity is high in the Airdock, a sudden change in temperature causes condensation. This condensation falls in a mist, creating the illusion of rain, according to the designer.

History

In 1929, Goodyear Zeppelin Corporation, later Goodyear Aerospace, sought a structure in which "lighter-than-air" ships (later known as airships, dirigibles, and blimps) could be constructed. The company commissioned Karl Arnstein of Akron, Ohio, whose design was inspired by the blueprints of the first aerodynamic-shaped airship hangar, built in 1913 in Dresden, Germany.

Construction took place from April 20 to November 25, 1929, at a cost of $2.2 million (equivalent to $ million in ).

When World War II broke out, enclosed production areas were desperately needed, and the airdock was used for building airships. The last airship built in the airdock was the U.S. Navy's ZPG-3W in 1960. The building later housed the photographic division of the Goodyear Aerospace Corporation.

In 1980, the Goodyear Airdock was designated a Historic Civil Engineering Landmark by the American Society of Civil Engineers.

The airdock has more recently served as the site of the 1986 kickoff rally for the United Way of Summit County, where 200,000 members of the public visited. Bill Clinton spoke there during his 1992 election campaign, bringing some 30,000 visitors to the site.

In 1987, the Loral Corporation purchased Goodyear Aerospace and the Goodyear Airdock as a result of James Goldsmith's greenmailing of Goodyear. The Loral Corporation (and its holdings, including the Goodyear Airdock) was purchased by Lockheed Martin in 1996.

 California company LTA Research and Exploration, together with the University of Akron, plans to use the airdock to develop electric-powered airships.

The airdock is not open to the public, but it can be seen by those traveling on U.S. Route 224 east of downtown Akron.

See also
 Airship hangar
Hangar No. 1, Lakehurst Naval Air Station
Hangar One (Mountain View, California)
Weeksville Dirigible Hangar
Bartolomeu de Gusmão Airport
MCAS Tustin

References

External links

National Park Service history of the Goodyear Airdock
Facts and figures
Aviation: From Sand Dunes to Sonic Booms, a National Park Service Discover Our Shared Heritage Travel Itinerary
Ohio and Erie Canal National Heritage Corridor, a National Park Service Discover Our Shared Heritage Travel Itinerary

Airships of the United States
Historic American Engineering Record in Ohio
Industrial buildings and structures on the National Register of Historic Places in Ohio
National Register of Historic Places in Summit County, Ohio
Transportation in Akron, Ohio
Buildings and structures in Akron, Ohio
Transport infrastructure completed in 1929
Airdock
Historic Civil Engineering Landmarks
Aircraft hangars on the National Register of Historic Places